Fremitomyces is a genus of fungi in the family Phyllachoraceae.

Species
As accepted by Species Fungorum;
Fremitomyces mahe 
Fremitomyces punctatus

References

External links
Index Fungorum

Sordariomycetes genera
Phyllachorales